Aycliffe is part of the name of 5 places in County Durham, England:

Newton Aycliffe, the oldest new town in the north of England
Great Aycliffe, a civil parish
Aycliffe Village, a village south of Newton Aycliffe
Aycliffe railway station
School Aycliffe, a village west of Newton Aycliffe and east of Heighington